In ice hockey, three forwards – the centre, right wing and left wing – operate as a unit called a line. The tradition of naming the lines extends back to the inaugural 1917–18 NHL season, when Didier Pitre, Jack Laviolette, and Newsy Lalonde of the Montreal Canadiens were dubbed the "Flying Frenchmen Line".

Lines with nicknames

See also
The Russian Five

References

Linemates
Linemates
Linemates
 
Line nicknames